The 20th Space Surveillance Squadron (20 SPSS) is a Space Delta 2 unit located at Eglin Air Force Base, Florida with the mission to execute multiplatform, tactical space warfighting domain characterization, recognition, and responsiveness to achieve 21st Space Wing and United States Space Command intent. The unit, formerly designated the 20th Space Control Squadron (20 SPCS), was renamed on 25 March 2022.

History
Eglin AFB Site C-6's squadron of the 9th Aerospace Defense Division activated in September 1968. and was turned over to Air Force Systems Command on 20 September 1968, and became operational in December 1968.

Eglin Site C-6 was assigned to Aerospace Defense Command on 20 December 1968. In 1972 20% of the site's "surveillance capability…became dedicated to search for SLBMs" and was subsequently renamed the 20th Missile Warning Squadron (the USAF SLBM Phased Array Radar System was initiated in November 1972 by the JCS while the Army's MSR and PAR phased arrays for missile defense were under construction.) The AN/FPS-85 facility was expanded in 1974, and "a scanning program to detect" SLBM warheads was installed in 1975. Alaska's AN/FPS-108 Cobra Dane phased array site was completed in 1976 and from 1979 until 1983, Site C-6 was assigned to Strategic Air Command's Directorate of Space and Missile Warning Systems (SAC/SX)--as were the new PAVE PAWS phased array sites operational in 1980.

On 25 March 2022, the squadron was renamed the 20th Space Surveillance Squadron (20 SPSS) in a ceremony officiated by the Space Delta 2 Commander, Colonel Mark Brock.

Space Command 
In 1983 Eglin Site C-6 transferred to Space Command (later renamed Air Force Space Command), and the "FPS-85 assumed a deep space role in November 1988 after receiving a range-extension upgrade enabling integration of many pulses." With the addition of additional missile warning sites becoming active, the squadron eliminated its missile warning mission, and the surveillance squadron name was restored in 1987. The unit was renamed the 20th Space surveillance squadron when a "new radar control computer" was installed at the site in 1994. By 1998, the site was providing space surveillance on "38 percent of the near-earth catalogue" of space objects (ESC's "SND C2 SPO was the System Program Office.) "A complete modernization…of the 1960s signal-processing system was being studied in 1999", and in 2002 Site C-6 was tracking "over 95 percent of all earth satellites daily."  The squadron was renamed the 20th Space Control Squadron in February 2003. In 2004, significant components of Naval Space Command were transferred to the 20th Space Control Squadron, including components of the former Naval Space Surveillance System (renamed the Air Force Space Surveillance System). By 2011 the site's "16 million observations of satellites per year" (rate of 30.4/minute) was "30 percent of the space surveillance network's total workload".

United States Space Force 
In September 2020, the 20 SPCS joined the newly created United States Space Force.

GEODSS 
In 2016, the 20th Space Control Squadron acquired the three Ground-based Electro-Optical Deep Space Surveillance (GEODSS) sites. GEODSS is an optical system that uses telescopes, low-light level TV cameras, and computers. It replaced an older system of six 20 inch (half meter) Baker-Nunn cameras which used photographic film.

There are three operational GEODSS sites that fall under the 20th Space Control Squadron:
 Detachment 1 Socorro, New Mexico 33°49′02″N 106°39′36″W / 33.8172°N 106.6599°W / 33.8172; -106.6599
 Detachment 2 Diego Garcia, British Indian Ocean Territory 7°24′42″S 72°27′08″E / 7.41173°S 72.45222°E / -7.41173; 72.45222.
 Detachment 3 AMOS, Maui, Hawaii 20°42′32″N 156°15′28″W / 20.7088°N 156.2578°W / 20.7088; -156.2578
GEODSS tracks objects in deep space, or from about  out to beyond geosynchronous altitudes. GEODSS requires nighttime and clear weather tracking because of the inherent limitations of an optical system. Each site has three telescopes. The telescopes have a  aperture and a two-degree field of view. The telescopes are able to "see" objects 10,000 times dimmer than the human eye can detect. This sensitivity, and sky background during daytime that masks satellites reflected light, dictates that the system operate at night. As with any ground-based optical system, cloud cover and local weather conditions directly influence its effectiveness. Each GEODSS site tracks approximately 3,000 objects per night out of 9,900 object that are regularly tracked and accounted for. Objects crossing the International Space Station (ISS) orbit within  will cause the ISS to adjust their orbit to avoid collision. The oldest object tracked is Object #5 (Vanguard 1) launched in 1958.

List of commanders

Lt Col James J. Hogan
Lt Col Shane M. Connary
Lt Col G. McCann
Lt Col Thomas G. Falzarano, July 2008 – June 2010
Lt Col George Tromba, June 2010
Lt Col Mitch Katosic, June 2012 – June 2014
Lt Col Mafwa Kuvibidila, June 2014 – June 2016
Lt Col Raj Agrawal, June 2016
Lt Col David Tipton, 26 June 2018
Lt Col Alfred Maynard, 16 July 2020

Decorations
Air Force Outstanding Unit Award 
1 January 2000 – 31 August 2001
1 January 1999 – 31 December 1999
1 January 1998 – 31 December 1998
1 October 1997 – 30 September 1999
1 October 1995 – 30 September 1997
1 September 1991 – 31 August 1993
1 September 1990 – 31 August 1991
1 September 1988 – 31 August 1990

See also
No. 1 Remote Sensor Unit RAAF

References

Squadrons of the United States Space Force
Military units and formations in Florida